is a Japanese three-piece band formed by Mikuni Shimokawa, Hiroyuki Matsugashita, and Takayuki Ito. They are distributed under Pony Canyon. To date, they have released one album on December 20, 2006 entitled . Shimokawa's upcoming single, Bird, will include a song performed by the band.

NapsaQ has a radio show named  on JOQR which began its weekly broadcast on October 4, 2006 from 0230-0300. The show no longer appears to be airing as it is not listed on JOQR's schedule.

References

External links
NapsaQ's Official Website 

Japanese pop music groups
Living people
Year of birth missing (living people)